The list of shipwrecks in 1843 includes ships sunk, foundered, wrecked, grounded, or otherwise lost during 1843.

January

February

March

April

May

June

July

August

September

October

November

December

Unknown date

References

1843